The IAU 100 km Asian Championships is an annual, ultrarunning competition over 100 kilometres for athletes from Asia and Oceana. It is organised by the International Association of Ultrarunners (IAU) and was first held in 2010.

Editions

Medal summary

Men

Women

References

External links
IAU official site

Asian 100 km
Recurring sporting events established in 2010
Ultramarathons